Alexandra Cadanțu-Ignatik (née Cadanțu; born 3 May 1990) is a Romanian tennis player.

On 6 January 2014, she reached her career-high singles ranking of world No. 59. Her best doubles ranking by the WTA is No. 101, achieved on 11 June 2012.

At Grand Slam tournaments, Cadanțu-Ignatik has won only one (main-draw) match, at the 2013 Wimbledon Championships. Usually, she is playing on the ITF Circuit.

In July 2021, Alexandra changed her name to Cadanțu-Ignatik, after marrying fellow tennis player Uladzimir Ignatik.

Career
Born in Bucharest, Cadanțu began playing tennis at age three. Her favourite surface is clay, her goal to reach the top 50.

2013

Cadanțu started the year in Shenzhen but was defeated by Bojana Jovanovski in the first round. Her next tournament was in Sydney, where she was defeated in the first qualifying round by Olga Puchkova. Alexandra then lost to Heather Watson in the Australian Open first round.

In February, she won her first match for the season in Cali, Colombia – defeating Laura Pous Tió. Then she lost in the second round to Sesil Karatantcheva in three sets, reached quarterfinals in Bogotá, Colombia, defeating Maria Joao Koehler in the first and Tereza Mrdeža in the second round. She then fell in the quarterfinals to Jelena Janković. Then, in Acapulco, Mexico, Cadanțu was defeated by Sara Errani in the first round. In March, she fell in Miami first qualifying round to Stefanie Vögele. She then lost to Madison Keys in the first round of Charleston.

She reached the semifinals in Katowice, Poland, in April, where she lost to Petra Kvitová. On her road, she defeated Yuliya Beygelzimer, Katarzyna Kawa, Raluca Olaru, Sabine Lisicki, each of them in straight sets, and Irina-Camelia Begu, and Shahar Pe'er in three. She has also reached the semifinals at the Budapest Grand Prix, where she lost in straight sets to compatriot Simona Halep and eventual winner of the tournament.

2014
Cadanțu started the year in Auckland where she had to retire in her first round, 1–6, 0–4 down against Kurumi Nara. She also fell at the first round in Hobart (losing to Olivia Rogowska), at the Australian Open (to Flavia Pennetta), and in Rio (to Teliana Pereira).

Then things started to improve with a quarterfinal at Florianópolis, beating wildcard Gabriela Cé in the first round and Dinah Pfizenmaier in the second before losing to Yaroslava Shvedova, in straight sets. Cadanțu fell in the first round at Indian Wells and Miami, losing to rising stars CoCo Vandeweghe and Zarina Diyas, respectively. In Katowice, she beat Yanina Wickmayer before losing a tight three-set match to third seed Carla Suárez Navarro. She then had a nine-match losing streak, including the French Open and Wimbledon, which she snapped at the $100k Contrexéville. She won the doubles title at Bucharest alongside compatriot Ana Bogdan; they beat Çağla Büyükakçay and Karin Knapp in the final. Later in the year, she reached quarterfinals of the ITF events at Saint-Malo, Monterrey and Victoria.

Performance timelines
Only main-draw results in WTA Tour, Grand Slam tournaments, Fed Cup/Billie Jean King Cup and Olympic Games are included in win–loss records.

Singles
Current after the 2023 Australian Open.

Doubles

WTA career finals

Singles: 1 (runner-up)

Doubles: 3 (1 title, 2 runner-ups)

WTA 125 tournament finals

Singles: 1 (runner-up)

ITF Circuit finals

Singles: 32 (11 titles, 21 runner–ups)

Doubles: 24 (12 titles, 12 runner–ups)

Notes

References

External links

 
 

1990 births
Living people
Tennis players from Bucharest
Romanian female tennis players
21st-century Romanian women